Mhaïreth or M'Heirth is one of the largest oases of the Adrar region in Mauritania. It is located near Terjit. Mhaïreth is part of the commune of Maaden in the Aoujeft Department.

Galerie

References

Populated places in Mauritania
Adrar Region